The courts of appeal in Sweden and in Finland, also known as Hovrätt (Swedish: 'Hovrätt') (literally "Royal Court") deal with appeals against decisions of the district courts. They also are responsible for supervising the operations of the district courts in their judicial district.

The courts of appeal in Sweden was the highest judicial body in Sweden until King Gustav III founded the Supreme Court of Sweden in 1789. Today, these courts function mostly as appellate courts. They are the second highest general courts in both Sweden and Finland, and both countries have six of them.

The first hovrätt, Svea Court of Appeal, was founded 1614 in Stockholm. In Finland, then a part of Sweden, the court in Turku was founded in 1623 by Gustavus Adolphus, mainly because it was difficult to travel from Finland to Stockholm.

During the imperial era, additional courts of appeal were introduced in order to relieve the original Svea hovrätt. Göta Court of Appeal was the second such court in Sweden proper, established in Jönköping in 1634. It was preceded by the court in Turku (1623) and the court in Tartu (1630), cities which during this era was part of the dominions of Sweden.

Current appellate courts
These are the current courts of appeal in Swedish and Finnish judiciary:

Sweden

Finland
The courts of appeal in Finland are:

 Turun hovioikeus/Åbo hovrätt, founded in 1623 (part of the Swedish judiciary until 1809)
 Vaasan hovioikeus/Vasa hovrätt, founded in 1775 (part of the Swedish judiciary until 1809)
 Itä-Suomen hovioikeus/Östra Finlands hovrätt, former Viipurin hovioikeus/Viborgs hovrätt (now in Kuopio), founded in 1839
 Helsingin hovioikeus/Helsingfors hovrätt, founded in 1952
 Kouvolan hovioikeus/Kouvola hovrätt, founded in 1978
 Rovaniemen hovioikeus/Rovaniemi hovrätt, founded in 1979

See also
Hovrättsråd
Judiciary of Finland
Judiciary of Sweden

References

External links
Swedish National Courts Administration
Judicial system in Finland

Courts in Sweden
Courts in Finland
Judiciary of Finland
Judiciary of Sweden
1614 establishments in Sweden